Marios Charalambous(born June 18, 1969) is a Cypriot former international football defender.

He started his career in 1990 from Apollon Limassol and he played there for ten years. Also, he played in Olympiakos Nicosia for two years and he ended his career in Enosis Neon Paralimni. He also had a brief spell with Kavala F.C. during the 1999–00 Greek Alpha Ethniki season.

Charalambous made 60 appearances for the Cyprus national football team from 1991 to 2002.

References

 

1969 births
Living people
Apollon Limassol FC players
Olympiakos Nicosia players
Enosis Neon Paralimni FC players
Cypriot footballers
Cyprus international footballers
Greek Cypriot people
Association football defenders
Kavala F.C. players
Sportspeople from Limassol